Reginald Lucien Frank Roger Watts (born March 23, 1972) is an American comedian, actor, beatboxer, and musician. His improvised musical sets are created using only his voice, a keyboard, and a looping machine. Watts refers to himself as a "disinformationist" who aims to disorient his audience in a comedic fashion. He was the regular house musician on the spoof IFC talkshow Comedy Bang! Bang! and leads the house band for The Late Late Show with James Corden.

Early life
Reginald Lucien Frank Roger Watts was born in Stuttgart on March 23, 1972, the son of French mother Christiane and African-American father Charles Alphonso Watts. His father was an officer in the Air Force, leading the family to live in Germany, France, Italy, and Spain before returning to the U.S. and settling in Great Falls, Montana, where Watts was raised; he graduated from Great Falls High School in 1990. He began piano and violin lessons at the age of five, with his love of music beginning as a young child when he saw Ray Charles play the piano on television. He moved to Seattle at the age of 18 to study music, attending the Art Institute of Seattle before studying jazz at Cornish College of the Arts.

Career

Early career (19962009)

In 1996, Watts became the frontman for the band Maktub. While recording and touring from 1996 to 2000 with Wayne Horvitz's 4+1 Ensemble as a keyboardist, he was forced to downsize his effects pedal from a Roland Space Echo tape delay to a Line 6 DL4 delay modeler, a smaller device that makes it easy to travel. He began using the Line 6 in live shows with Maktub to replicate the duplicate harmonies from the recorded material. He experimented with improvising entire songs in solo acts with the Line 6, while trying to sound like Tom Waits, playing initial gigs at small Seattle venues and artist bungalows. While in Seattle, he composed musical scores for dance choreographers and dabbled in sketch comedy with longtime friend and future playwright Tommy Smith, who later ended their collaborative relationship when Watts failed to credit him for co-writing the lyrics of his viral hits "Fuck Shit Stack" and "What About Blowjobs?"

In 2004, after recording five albums over eight years, Watts moved to the Lower East Side of New York City. In 2005, he recorded his first solo single, "So Beautiful". Inspired by The State and Wet Hot American Summer, he began infusing spontaneous comedic material with the beat-box-driven musical compositions. He also shot comedic shorts for Superdeluxe, Vimeo, and CollegeHumor.

In 2007, Watts appeared on Plum TV's Scott Bateman Presents Scott Bateman Presents and starred in the CollegeHumor internet video "What About Blowjobs?" The video became a viral hit. The same year, he also wrote and performed the theme song for Penelope Princess of Pets, a web comedy series featuring Kristen Schaal and H. Jon Benjamin. In 2008, Watts recorded a new special entitled Disinformation, which features his performance at the Under the Radar Festival at the Public Theater. He also appeared in the independent film Steel of Fire Warriors 2010 A.D. as a Mutantzoid Underling and on an episode of Late Night with Jimmy Fallon, as well as making other various television appearances.

In 2009, Watts recorded his first solo EP, Pot Cookies. He also began appearing on the PBS Kids' children's program The Electric Company. He performed in his first solo short film Watts Does London and made a small appearance on Comedy Central's Michael and Michael Have Issues. He then did voice work for an episode of Adult Swim's The Venture Bros., Australia's Good News Week, and appeared in the U.S. documentary The Yes Men Fix the World. He also toured in support of Devo in a fall 2009 tour.

Why Shit So Crazy? (20102011)
In 2010, Waverly Films shot a one-hour special on Watts called Why Shit So Crazy? The special features Watts in live performance at New York venues Galapagos, The Bellhouse, and (Le) Poisson Rouge, bookended with brief sketches and a music video of Watts' "Fuck Shit Stack". Comedy Central aired Why Shit So Crazy? and released the film as a dual DVD/CD package. Afterwards, Watts made various public appearances, including during Conan O'Brien's The Legally Prohibited from Being Funny on Television Tour.

A Live at Central Park (2012)
Watts's second stand-up special, A Live at Central Park, premiered on Comedy Central in the "Secret Stash" on May 12, 2012. It was completely uncensored and received positive reviews. The film was made available as a CD/DVD through Watts' official website as well as Comedy Central's online store.

Soon afterwards, Watts performed a song with LCD Soundsystem on their farewell documentary movie, Shut Up and Play the Hits.

Comedy Bang! Bang! (20122015)
In 2012, Watts began starring opposite Scott Aukerman on the IFC series Comedy Bang! Bang! based on the podcast of the same name. That same year, Watts began collaborating with Michael Cera, Tim & Eric, and Sarah Silverman to create a comedy YouTube channel called Jash.

In 2013, On the Boards recorded a new Watts special entitled Transition, which played at various arts festivals including the Under the Radar Festival at The Public Theater; it was winner of the MAP Fund Award and Creative Capital award. The same year, Watts was invited to perform at Yoko Ono's Meltdown 2013 on the South Bank in London where he was supported by Mac Lethal.

In 2014, Watts contributed the outro vocal on "Holy City" and beatbox on the title track of the Joan As Police Woman album The Classic. He also appeared as the last act in the season 4 premiere of John Oliver's New York Stand-Up Show where he told some jokes and performed a song. In December 2014, following CBS's announcement that Watts would lead The Late Late Show band, Aukerman announced that Watts would leave Comedy Bang! Bang! after the first half of 2015. Watts' final episode of Comedy Bang! Bang! was on June 5, 2015.

The Late Late Show with James Corden and Spatial (2015present)
Watts currently serves as the bandleader and announcer for The Late Late Show with James Corden. He has described his role on the show as "a mix of Paul Shaffer and Andy Richter". His band on the show was unofficially named Karen, but in response to the rise of that name being used as an insult, the band was renamed Melissa. Watts has a slot on the show to ask a guest a question about anything called Reggie's Question. The questions are a continuation of his time on Comedy Bang! Bang! and follow his preference for surreal comedy in his stand-up act.

On December 6, 2016, Watts' Netflix special Spatial was released.

Performance style
Watts utilizes improvisation in his solo shows, which consist of him singing and rapping both with words and with sound poetry, accompanying himself by either beatboxing, performing vocal basslines into a loop machine, or simply by playing the keyboard. His act also showcases his trademark style of stand-up comedy, consisting of him rapidly alternating between topics of discussion in both rational and nonsensical manners, making random sounds and gibberish noises, and speaking in other accents and languages at unexpected times, all with the intent of playfully and comically disorienting his audiences. He has a four-and-a-half octave vocal range.

Filmography

Film
 Steel of Fire Warriors 2010 A.D. (2008) as Mutantzoid Underling in Bar
 The Yes Men Fix the World (2009) as himself
 Reggie Watts Does London (2009)
 Why Shit So Crazy? (2010) as himself
 Conan O'Brien Can't Stop (2011) as himself (cameo)
 Tell Your Friends! The Concert Film (2012) as himself
 Shut Up and Play the Hits (2012) as himself
 A Live at Central Park (2012) as himself
 Transition (2013) as himself
 Pitch Perfect 2 (2015) as Tone Hanger Singer and Beatboxer
 Creative Control (2015) as himself
 My Entire High School Sinking Into the Sea (2016) as Assaf
 Spatial (2016) as himself
 Keep in Touch (2016) as Dr. Harry Clark
 Duck Duck Goose (2018) as Carl
 Star Wars: The Rise of Skywalker (2019) as Additional voices
 The SpongeBob Movie: Sponge on the Run (2020) as Chancellor
 Extinct (2021) as Hoss

Television
 Scott Batemen Presents Scott Batemen Presents (2007) as himself
 Saving Steve Agee (2007) as himself
 Superjail! (2008)
 Late Night with Jimmy Fallon (2009) as himself
 Made Here (2009) as himself
 The Ha!ifax Comedy Fest (2009) as himself
 The Venture Bros. (2009) as The Delivery Guy
 The Electric Company (2009–2011) as Music Man
 The Tonight Show with Conan O'Brien (2010) as himself
 Good News Week (2010) as himself
 Team Coco Presents the Conan Writers Live (2010) – Himself
 Conan O'Brien Can't Stop (2011)
 Cracker Night (2011) as himself
 Mash Up (2011)
 Talk Stoop (2011) as himself
 Funny As Hell (2011) as himself
 Doctor Who: The Best-of Specials (2011) as Host
 The Green Room with Paul Provenza (2011) as himself
 Delocated (2012) as himself
 Russell Howard's Good News (2012) as himself
 The Top 100 Video Games of All Time (2012) as himself
 7 Minutes in Heaven (2012) as himself
 Stand Down: True Tales from Stand-Up Comedy (2012) as himself
 Mash Up (2012) as himself
 The Secret Policeman's Ball (2012) as himself
 Totally Biased with W. Kamau Bell (2013) as himself
 Jimmy Kimmel Live! (2013)
 Reggie Makes Music (2013)
 2013 YouTube Music Awards (2013) as Host
 America's Next Top Model (2013) as himself
 Comedy Bang! Bang! (2012–2016) as himself
 Inside Amy Schumer (2014) as Neighbor
 The Late Late Show with James Corden (2015–present) as himself
 The Mr. Peabody & Sherman Show (2017) as Rejgie
 Baroness von Sketch Show (2017)
 Taskmaster (2018) as Taskmaster
 Tuca & Bertie (2019) as Pastry Pete (voice)
 Ask the StoryBots (2019) as Bernard the Nurse

Internet videos
 CollegeHumor – "What About Blowjobs?" (2007)
 Jake Lodwick - "It's Over" (2007)
 Jake Lodwick - "The Beginning is Near" (2008)
 Disinformation (2008)
 bd – "I Just Want To" (2009)
 "Fuck Shit Stack" (2010)
 Pop!Tech – "Reggie Watts: Humor In Music" (2011)
 Pop!Tech – "Reggie Watts: A Send-Off In Style" (2011)
 Funny or Die – "Reggie Watts Live" (2012)
 TED – "Reggie Watts Disorients You in the Most Entertaining Way" (2012)
 "Reggie Watts Is Skrillex" (2012)
 Jash – Various Videos (2013–present)
 "Ian Up For Whatever" – Bud Light Super Bowl XLVIII ad (2014)
 Good Mythical Morning – "Which Musician Am I?" (2018)
 RIGHT NOW - "RIGHT NOW w/ John Goblikon S4 E2 (Reggie Watts)" 
 Marti Fischer - "Impro mit REGGIE WATTS | Ein Loop zwischendurch"

Music videos
 "Night and Day" by Hot Chip (2012)
 "Stop Desire" by Tegan and Sara (2016)
 "Move" by Saint Motel (2017)
 "Ask Yourself" by Panther Modern (2019)

Video games
 Accounting+
 Cartoon Network Journeys

Discography

Solo albums
 Simplified (2003)
 Why Shit So Crazy? (2010)
 Live at Third Man – 12" Vinyl (2011)
 A Live at Central Park (2012)
 Spatial (2016)

Solo singles
 "So Beautiful" (2005)
 "Get Ready" (2014)

Collaborative albums

Maktub
 Subtle Ways (1999)
 Khronos (2003)
 Say What You Mean (2005)
 Start It Over (2007)
 Five (2009)

4 + 1 Ensemble
 4+1 Ensemble (Intuition, 1996)
 From a Window (Avant, 2000)

Wajatta
 Casual High Technology (Comedy Dynamics, 2018)
 Don't Let Get You Down (Brainfeeder, 2020)

Collaborative songs
 "Closer" [Brent Laurence feat. Reggie Watts] (2004)
 "Tears" [Linkwood] (2009)
 "Dance Anthem of the 80's" [Regina Spektor] (2012)
 "Spaghetti Circus" [Still Going feat. Reggie Watts] (2012)
 "Drunk Texts to Myself" Trevor Moore feat. Reggie Watts] (2013)
 "We Got A Love" [Shit Robot feat. Reggie Watts] (2013)
 "Bassface" The Midnight Beast feat. Reggie Watts (2014)
 "MFN" / "Housekeeping" Cibo Matto, Hotel Valentine (2014)
 "Holy City" / "The Classic" Joan as Police Woman (2014)
 "Sunshine" Flight Facilities (2014)
 "Trumpy Trump" The Cooties (2016)
 "There Should Be Unicorns" Oczy Mlody, The Flaming Lips, (2017)
 "Captain Crunch" Czarface Meets Metal Face, Czarface & MF Doom (2018)
 "Stranded" Flight Facilities (2018)
 "Daddi (Reggie Watts Remix)" Cherry Glazerr (2019)
 "OATMILK" (with Chelsea Peretti) (2020)

Awards and honors
Watts is the winner of the 2005 Malcolm Hardee "Oy Oy" Award, the 2006 Andy Kaufman Comedy Award, and the 2006 Seattle Mayor's Arts Award. He was also awarded the 2008 MAP Fund and the 2009 Creative Capitol Grant for the performing arts, and won the 2009 ECNY Award for Best Musical Comedy Act.

References

External links

 
 
 
 Official "Fuck Shit Stack" video
 Official "What About Blowjobs?" video
 Live performance (June 2012) for NPR
 ReggieWatts/TommySmith Theatre
 Reggie Watts – "A Live at Central Park"

1972 births
African-American male comedians
American comedy musicians
American male comedians
African-American musicians
African-American stand-up comedians
American stand-up comedians
Cornish College of the Arts alumni
The Late Late Show with James Corden
Living people
Comedians from Montana
American people of French descent
American expatriates in Germany
American expatriates in Spain
American expatriates in Italy
American expatriates in France
Rappers from Seattle
Singers with a four-octave vocal range
21st-century American rappers
21st-century American comedians
Third Man Records artists
African-American male singers